Tim D. White (born August 24, 1950) is an American paleoanthropologist and Professor of Integrative Biology at the University of California, Berkeley. He is best known for leading the team which discovered Ardi, the type specimen of Ardipithecus ramidus, a 4.4 million-year-old likely human ancestor. Prior to that discovery, his early career was notable for his work on Lucy as Australopithecus afarensis with discoverer Donald Johanson.

Career
Timothy Douglas White was born on August 24, 1950, in Los Angeles County, California and raised in Lake Arrowhead in neighboring San Bernardino County. He majored in biology and anthropology at the University of California, Riverside. He received his Ph.D. in physical anthropology from the University of Michigan. White took a position in the Department of Anthropology at the University of California, Berkeley in 1977, later moving to the university's Department of Integrative Biology. White taught courses on human paleontology and human osteology. He is a professor emeritus having retired in the spring of 2022.

He is director of the Human Evolution Research Center and co-director, with Berhane Asfaw, Yonas Beyene, and Giday WoldeGabriel, of the Middle Awash Research Project.

White has taught and mentored many paleoanthropologists who have subsequently gone on to prominence in the field, including Berhane Asfaw, William Henry Gilbert, Yohannes Haile-Selassie, and Gen Suwa and thousands of undergraduate and graduate students at the University of California, Berkeley.

Since 2013, White has been listed on the Advisory Council of the National Center for Science Education.

White has been accused of mistreating and misappropriating Indigenous people's remains. Indigenous nations in the land colonized by the state of California protest that he failed to comply with the Native American Graves Protection and Repatriation Act (NAGPRA), though no U.S. colonial court has made such a finding. Laura Miranda, chair of the California Native American Heritage Commission, has stated that his breach of NAGPRA's codes was "a major moral, ethical, and potentially legal violation." He has supported the use of Native people's remains as teaching tools in classrooms and has been accused of careless and negligent treatment of human remains.

Collaborations 
In 1974, White worked with Richard Leakey's team at Koobi Fora, Kenya. Leakey was so impressed with White's work that he recommended him to his mother, Mary Leakey, to help her with hominid fossils she had found at Laetoli, Tanzania.

White took a job at the University of California, Berkeley in 1977 and collaborated with J. Desmond Clark and F. Clark Howell. In 1994, White discovered 4.4 million-year-old Ardipithecus ramidus, a likely human ancestor from an era which was previously empty of fossil evidence. Near the Awash River in Ethiopia, he found an almost complete fossilized female skeleton, named "Ardi". He took nearly 15 years to prepare publication of the description.

In 1996, White, along with paleontologist Berhane Asfaw discovered fossils of a 2.5 million-year-old species BOU-VP-12/130 Australopithecus garhi, which is thought to predate H. habilis tool use and manufacturing by 100,000 to 600,000 years.

Honors
Fellow of the California Academy of Sciences
Fellow of the American Association for the Advancement of Science
David S. Ingalls Jr. Award from the Cleveland Museum of Natural History
Member of the National Academy of Sciences
 Academy of Achievement Golden Plate Award (1995)
Distinguished Alumnus of the Year (2000) at the University of California, Riverside

Selected publications

See also 
 List of fossil sites (with link directory)
 List of hominina (hominid) fossils (with images)

References

External links
Webpage on Dr.White
  
Conversation with Tim White
Tim White's research profile
UCB HERC Director - Director of Human Evolution Research Center at UC Berkeley
Project Leader - Middle Awash Research Project

University of California, Riverside alumni
American anthropologists
Members of the United States National Academy of Sciences
University of Michigan alumni
1950 births
Living people
Paleoanthropologists
University of California, Berkeley faculty
Human evolution theorists
People from Lake Arrowhead, California